Oskar Schmidt (27 May 1908 – 26 December 1974) was a Swiss ice hockey player who competed for the Swiss national team at the 1936 Winter Olympics in Garmisch-Partenkirchen.

References

External links
Oskar Schmidt statistics at Sports-Reference.com

1908 births
1974 deaths
Ice hockey players at the 1936 Winter Olympics
Olympic ice hockey players of Switzerland
Swiss ice hockey defencemen